ABBA  is the third studio album by the Swedish pop group ABBA. It was originally released on 21 April 1975 through Polar Music and featured the hits "SOS", "I Do, I Do, I Do, I Do, I Do" and "Mamma Mia".

Overview 
Following the Eurovision success of "Waterloo", ABBA saw the band gaining worldwide recognition. "I Do, I Do, I Do, I Do, I Do" topped the charts in Australia, as did "Mamma Mia" shortly after. "SOS" and "Mamma Mia" became hits in both the United States and the United Kingdom. The album saw ABBA dabble with reggae on "Tropical Loveland" and includes a grand, pseudo-classical keyboard instrumental in the traditions of Keith Emerson and Rick Wakeman with "Intermezzo No. 1" (early working title: "Mama").

ABBA was first released on CD in Japan in 1986 by Polydor Records. This release contains a slightly different mix of "Man in the Middle" not found on any subsequent CD pressing and thus is highly sought after by collectors. ABBA was released on CD throughout Europe in 1987 also by Polydor, with five songs added from the Waterloo and Ring Ring albums, which were not available on CD until 1990. ABBA was released on CD in Sweden by Polar Music in 1988, featuring the original 11 tracks only. The album has been reissued in digitally remastered form several times: in 1997 as part of "The ABBA Remasters" series with two bonus tracks, in 2001 with an updated cover artwork, in 2005 as part of The Complete Studio Recordings box set, and most recently in 2012 as a "Deluxe Edition". On the original UK cassette release of the album, "Bang-A-Boomerang" was split in two parts, being faded during the second verse at the end of side one and continued at the beginning of side two.

Track listing
Source:

Notes
 signifies arranged by

Non-album tracks

"Baby"
Recorded 18 October 1974 at Glen Studio. The lyrics for the song were later re-written and became "Rock Me". "Baby" was first released on CD on the box set Thank You for the Music as part of the ABBA Undeleted section.

"Crazy World"
"Crazy World" was recorded on 16 October 1974 at Glen Studio during sessions for this album. The track was left unreleased until it surfaced again during the Arrival sessions, and was eventually released as the b-side to the "Money, Money, Money" single in November 1976. "Crazy World" was first released on CD on the box set Thank You for the Music, and then appeared as a bonus track on the CD re-issue of the album ABBA.
"Here Comes Ruby Jamie"
"Here Comes Ruby Jamie" was recorded on 16 September 1974 at Glen Studio, and is one of the rare occasions where Benny Andersson sings the lead vocals. The song was first released on CD on the box set "Thank You for the Music" as part of the ABBA Undeleted section.
"Medley: Pick a Bale of Cotton/On Top of Old Smokey/Midnight Special"
Recording began on 6 May 1975 at Glen Studio. It remains ABBA's only studio recorded release of material not written by themselves, and was originally released on the 1975 German charity album "Stars Im Zeichen Eines Guten Sterns". In 1978, it featured (with a slight audio tweak, for many years mistakenly referred to as a 'remix') as the B-side of the "Summer Night City" single. The song was first released on CD on the box set Thank You for the Music, then the 1978 version appeared as a bonus track on the CD re-issue of the album ABBA.
"Rikky Rock 'N' Roller"
"Rikky Rock 'N' Roller" was recorded on 15 September 1974 at Glen Studio, and was first released on CD on the box set Thank You for the Music as part of the ABBA Undeleted section. Later released by Jerry Williams on the album Kick Down in 1976.

Personnel
ABBA
 Agnetha Fältskog vocals
 Anni-Frid Lyngstad vocals
 Björn Ulvaeus – guitars, vocals
 Benny Andersson – piano, marimba, accordion, organ, clavinet, synthesizers, vocals

Additional musicians
 Roger Palm – drums, tambourine, timpani
 Ola Brunkert – drums on "SOS", "Man in the Middle" and "So Long"
 Rutger Gunnarsson – bass
 Mike Watson – bass on "Mamma Mia", "Tropical Loveland", "SOS", "Man in the Middle", "I Do, I Do, I Do, I Do, I Do" and "So Long"
 Janne Schaffer – guitar on Mamma Mia, "Hey, Hey Helen", "SOS", "Man in the Middle", "Bang-A-Boomerang" and "So Long"
 Finn Sjöberg – guitar on "Mamma Mia", "Rock Me", "Intermezzo No. 1" and "I've Been Waiting For You" 
 Lasse Wellander – guitar on "Tropical Loveland", "I Do, I Do, I Do, I Do, I Do", "Rock Me" and "Intermezzo No. 1"
 Ulf Andersson  – alto saxophone, tenor saxophone
 Bruno Glenmark – trumpet
 Björn J:son Lindh; Sven-Olof Walldoff – string arrangements
 Björn J:son Lindh – horn arrangements

Production
 Benny Andersson; Björn Ulvaeus – producers, arrangers
 Michael B. Tretow – engineer
 Ola Lager – photography
 Sten-Åke Magnusson – original album design
 Jon Astley; Tim Young; Michael B. Tretow – remastering for the 1997 Remasters
 Jon Astley; Michael B. Tretow – remastering for the 2001 Remasters
 Henrik Jonsson – Remastered for The Complete Studio Recordings box set

Charts

Weekly charts

Monthly charts

Year-end charts

Sales and Certifications

References

External links
 

ABBA albums
Polar Music albums
1975 albums
Albums produced by Björn Ulvaeus
Albums produced by Benny Andersson
Atlantic Records albums
Epic Records albums